Alpaida is a genus of South American orb-weaver spiders first described by Octavius Pickard-Cambridge in 1889.

Species
 it contains 153 species:

A. acuta (Keyserling, 1865) — Panama to Argentina
A. albocincta (Mello-Leitão, 1945) — Venezuela to Argentina
A. almada Levi, 1988 — Brazil
A. alticeps (Keyserling, 1879) — Brazil, Paraguay
A. alto Levi, 1988 — Paraguay
A. alvarengai Levi, 1988 — Brazil
A. amambay Levi, 1988 — Colombia, Paraguay
A. anchicaya Levi, 1988 — Colombia
A. angra Levi, 1988 — Brazil
A. antonio Levi, 1988 — Brazil, Guyana, French Guiana
A. arvoredo Buckup & Rodrigues, 2011 — Brazil
A. atomaria (Simon, 1895) — Brazil, Argentina
A. banos Levi, 1988 — Colombia, Ecuador, French Guiana
A. biasii Levi, 1988 — Brazil
A. bicornuta (Taczanowski, 1878) — Costa Rica to Argentina
A. bischoffi Levi, 1988 — Brazil
A. boa Levi, 1988 — Brazil, French Guiana
A. boraceia Levi, 1988 — Brazil
A. cachimbo Levi, 1988 — Brazil
A. cali Levi, 1988 — Colombia
A. calotypa (Chamberlin, 1916) — Peru
A. canela Levi, 1988 — Brazil
A. canoa Levi, 1988 — Brazil
A. caramba Buckup & Rodrigues, 2011 — Brazil
A. carminea (Taczanowski, 1878) — Peru, Brazil, Paraguay, Argentina
A. chaco Levi, 1988 — Paraguay
A. championi (O. Pickard-Cambridge, 1889) — Guatemala to Colombia
A. chapada Levi, 1988 — Brazil
A. chickeringi Levi, 1988 — Panama to Brazil
A. cisneros Levi, 1988 — Colombia, Ecuador
A. citrina (Keyserling, 1892) — Brazil, Argentina
A. clarindoi Nogueira & Dias, 2015 — Brazil
A. conica O. Pickard-Cambridge, 1889 — Panama
A. constant Levi, 1988 — Brazil
A. coroico Levi, 1988 — Bolivia
A. costai Levi, 1988 — Argentina
A. cuiaba Levi, 1988 — Brazil
A. cuyabeno Levi, 1988 — Colombia, Ecuador
A. darlingtoni Levi, 1988 — Colombia
A. deborae Levi, 1988 — Brazil, Suriname, French Guiana
A. delicata (Keyserling, 1892) — Colombia, Peru, Bolivia, Brazil, French Guiana
A. dominica Levi, 1988 — Lesser Antilles
A. eberhardi Levi, 1988 — Colombia
A. elegantula (Archer, 1965) — Martinique
A. ericae Levi, 1988 — Brazil, Argentina
A. erythrothorax (Taczanowski, 1873) — French Guiana, Brazil
A. gallardoi Levi, 1988 — Brazil, Paraguay, Argentina
A. gracia Levi, 1988 — Argentina
A. graphica (O. Pickard-Cambridge, 1889) — Mexico to Panama
A. grayi (Blackwall, 1863) — Brazil, Paraguay, Uruguay, Argentina
A. guimaraes Levi, 1988 — Brazil, Guyana
A. gurupi Levi, 1988 — Colombia, Brazil
A. guto Abrahim & Bonaldo, 2008 — Brazil
A. haligera (Archer, 1971) — Peru, Venezuela
A. hartliebi Levi, 1988 — Brazil
A. hoffmanni Levi, 1988 — Brazil, Paraguay
A. holmbergi Levi, 1988 — Argentina
A. iguazu Levi, 1988 — Brazil, Argentina
A. imperatrix Baptista, Castanheira & do Prado, 2018 — Brazil
A. imperialis Baptista, Castanheira & do Prado, 2018 — Brazil
A. iquitos Levi, 1988 — Peru, Ecuador, Brazil, French Guiana
A. itacolomi Santos & Santos, 2010 — Brazil
A. itapua Levi, 1988 — Paraguay
A. itauba Levi, 1988 — Brazil, Argentina
A. jacaranda Levi, 1988 — Brazil
A. kartabo Levi, 1988 — Guyana
A. keyserlingi Levi, 1988 — Brazil
A. kochalkai Levi, 1988 — Colombia
A. latro (Fabricius, 1775) — Brazil, Uruguay, Paraguay, Argentina
A. leucogramma (White, 1841) — Panama to Argentina
A. levii Saturnino, Rodrigues & Bonaldo, 2015 — Brazil
A. lomba Levi, 1988 — Brazil
A. losamigos Deza & Andía, 2014 — Peru
A. lubinae Levi, 1988 — Venezuela
A. machala Levi, 1988 — Ecuador
A. madeira Levi, 1988 — Brazil
A. manicata Levi, 1988 — Colombia, Brazil
A. marista Baptista, Castanheira & do Prado, 2018 — Brazil
A. marmorata (Taczanowski, 1873) — Ecuador, Peru, French Guiana
A. marta Levi, 1988 — Colombia
A. mato Levi, 1988 — Brazil
A. mendensis Baptista, Castanheira & do Prado, 2018 — Brazil
A. moata (Chamberlin & Ivie, 1936) — Panama, Colombia
A. moka Levi, 1988 — Peru, Brazil, Bolivia
A. monzon Levi, 1988 — Peru
Alpaida m. audiberti Dierkens, 2014 — French Guiana
A. morro Levi, 1988 — Brazil
A. muco Levi, 1988 — Colombia
A. murtinho Levi, 1988 — Brazil
A. nadleri Levi, 1988 — Venezuela
A. nancho Levi, 1988 — Peru
A. narino Levi, 1988 — Colombia
A. natal Levi, 1988 — Brazil
A. navicula (L. Koch, 1871) — Brazil
A. negro Levi, 1988 — Colombia, Brazil
A. nigrofrenata (Simon, 1895) — Brazil
A. niveosigillata (Mello-Leitão, 1941) — Colombia, Ecuador
A. nonoai Levi, 1988 — Brazil
A. octolobata Levi, 1988 — Brazil, Argentina
A. oliverioi (Soares & Camargo, 1948) — Brazil
A. orgaos Levi, 1988 — Brazil
A. oyapockensis Dierkens, 2014 — French Guiana
A. pedro Levi, 1988 — Brazil
A. penca Deza & Andía, 2014 — Peru
A. picchu Levi, 1988 — Peru
A. quadrilorata (Simon, 1897) — Brazil, Paraguay, Uruguay, Argentina
A. queremal Levi, 1988 — Colombia
A. rioja Levi, 1988 — Brazil, Argentina
A. rosa Levi, 1988 — Brazil, Argentina
A. rossi Levi, 1988 — Peru, Brazil
A. rostratula (Keyserling, 1892) — Brazil, Argentina
A. rubellula (Keyserling, 1892) — Brazil, Paraguay, Argentina
A. sandrei (Simon, 1895) — Brazil
A. santosi Levi, 1988 — Brazil
A. schneblei Levi, 1988 — Colombia
A. scriba (Mello-Leitão, 1940) — Brazil
A. septemmammata (O. Pickard-Cambridge, 1889) — Mexico to Argentina
A. sevilla Levi, 1988 — Colombia
A. silencio Levi, 1988 — Colombia
A. simla Levi, 1988 — Trinidad, Brazil
A. sobradinho Levi, 1988 — Brazil
A. sulphurea (Taczanowski, 1873) — French Guiana
A. sumare Levi, 1988 — Brazil
A. tabula (Simon, 1895) — Guyana to Bolivia
A. tayos Levi, 1988 — Ecuador, Peru, Brazil, Guyana, French Guiana
A. teresinha Braga-Pereira & Santos, 2013 — Brazil
A. thaxteri Levi, 1988 — Trinidad
A. tijuca Levi, 1988 — Brazil
A. toninho Braga-Pereira & Santos, 2013 — Brazil
A. tonze Santos & Santos, 2010 — Brazil
A. trilineata (Taczanowski, 1878) — Peru
A. trispinosa (Keyserling, 1892) — Panama to Argentina
A. truncata (Keyserling, 1865) — Mexico to Argentina
Alpaida t. obscura (Caporiacco, 1948) — Guyana
Alpaida t. sexmaculata (Caporiacco, 1948) — Guyana
A. tullgreni (Caporiacco, 1955) — Venezuela
A. tuonabo (Chamberlin & Ivie, 1936) — Panama
A. urucuca Levi, 1988 — Brazil
A. utcuyacu Levi, 1988 — Peru
A. utiariti Levi, 1988 — Brazil
A. vanzolinii Levi, 1988 — Peru, Brazil, Argentina
A. variabilis (Keyserling, 1864) — Colombia
A. venger Castanheira & Baptista, 2015 — Brazil
A. veniliae (Keyserling, 1865) — Panama to Argentina
A. vera Levi, 1988 — Brazil
A. versicolor (Keyserling, 1877) — Brazil, Paraguay, Uruguay, Argentina
A. wenzeli (Simon, 1898) — St. Vincent
A. weyrauchi Levi, 1988 — Peru
A. yanayacu Saturnino, Rodrigues & Bonaldo, 2015 — Brazil
A. yotoco Levi, 1988 — Colombia
A. yucuma Levi, 1988 — Brazil
A. yungas Levi, 1988 — Bolivia
A. yuto Levi, 1988 — Paraguay, Argentina

References

External links

Araneidae
Araneomorphae genera